Copper, Oregon may refer to:

 Copper, Jackson County, Oregon, a submerged ghost town flooded by the Applegate Dam
 Copper, Wallowa County, Oregon, a ghost town on the Oregon-Idaho border now part of Hells Canyon National Recreation Area